Bill Hutchens is an Australian-British independent film actor, producer and director who portrayed Dr. Sebring  in 2011 exploitation horror film The Human Centipede 2 (Full Sequence) directed by Tom Six. He has appeared in many Australian and international films. He runs his own independent film production company called Bill Hutchens Films. Currently Bill is in post-production on the feature film Kindred Spirits, a production where he was director and producer.

Partial filmography

As actor

As director

References

External links

21st-century Australian male actors
Australian male film actors
British male film actors
Living people
Year of birth missing (living people)